The French Confederation of Christian Workers (CFTC) is one of the five major French confederation of trade unions, belonging to the social Christian tradition.

It was founded in 1919 as the Trade Union of Employees of Industry and Commerce under the inspiration of Exupérien Mas with the goal of safeguarding the material as well as the spiritual interests of its members. In 1964, the union split, a majority founding the French Democratic Confederation of Labour (CFDT), a non-confessional trade-union.

The CFTC is a member of the International Trade Union Confederation and the European Trade Union Confederation. Its leader is Jacques Voisin.

Professional elections

The CFTC won 8.69% of the vote in the employee's college during the 2008 professional elections. This result, however, is below the CFTC's 9.65% result in 2002, its best showing to date. In 2021 the CFTC won 11% of the vote.

Affiliates
The following federations are affiliated:

State agents
Agriculture
Banks
Bâti-Mat TP
CMTE (chemistry, mining, textile, energy)
National Federation of Agents of Local Authorities - CFTC
CSFV (trade, services and sales force)
Graphic, written and audiovisual communication
FESEP (Federation of Private Education Unions)
CFTC Education
CFTC Metallurgy Federation
CFTC Pôle Emploi Federation
Post and telecommunications
PSE Federation (Social Protection and Employment)
Fédération CFTC Santé-sociales
General Federation of Transport CFTC

Leadership

General Secretaries
1919: Gaston Tessier
1948: Maurice Bouladoux
1953: Georges Levard
1961: Eugène Descamps
1964: Jacques Tessier
1970: Jean Bornard
1981: Guy Drilleaud
1990: Alain Deleu
1993: Jacques Voisin
2002: Jacky Dintinger
2008: Philippe Louis
2011: Pascale Coton
2015: Bernard Sagez
2019: Eric Heitz

Presidents
1919: Jules Zirnheld
1946: Georges Torcq
1948: Gaston Tessier
1953: Maurice Bouladoux
1961: Georges Levard
1964: Joseph Sauty
1970: Jacques Tessier
1981: Jean Bornard
1990: Guy Drilleaud
1993: Alain Deleu
2002: Jacques Voisin
2011: Philippe Louis
2020: Cyril Chabanier

See also

 French Confederation of Management – General Confederation of Executives
 French Democratic Confederation of Labour
 General Confederation of Labour (France)
 Mouvement des Entreprises de France
 Politics of France
 Solidaires Unitaires Démocratiques
 Workers' Force
 Simone Saint-Dénis

References

Trade unions in France
International Trade Union Confederation
European Trade Union Confederation
National trade union centers of France
Christian trade unions
1919 establishments in France
Trade unions established in 1919